Barahna is a genus of Australian intertidal spiders that was first described by V. T. Davies in 2003.<ref name=Davi2003>{{cite journal| last=Davies| first=V. T.| year=2003| title=Barahna, a new spider genus from eastern Australia (Araneae: Amaurobioidea)| journal=Memoirs of the Queensland Museum| pages=237–250| volume=49| url=https://www.biodiversitylibrary.org/page/54366685}}</ref> The name is derived from baran-barahn, the Bundjalung word for "spider". Originally placed with the Stiphidiidae, it was moved to the intertidal spiders after the results of a 2017 genetic study.

Species
 it contains eight species, found in Victoria, New South Wales, and Queensland:Barahna booloumba Davies, 2003 (type) – Australia (Queensland, New South Wales)Barahna brooyar Davies, 2003 – Australia (Queensland)Barahna glenelg Davies, 2003 – Australia (Victoria)Barahna myall Davies, 2003 – Australia (New South Wales)Barahna scoria Davies, 2003 – Australia (Queensland)Barahna taroom Davies, 2003 – Australia (Queensland)Barahna toonumbar Davies, 2003 – Australia (New South Wales)Barahna yeppoon'' Davies, 2003 – Australia (Queensland, New South Wales)

See also
 List of Desidae species

References

Araneomorphae genera
Desidae
Spiders of Australia

Taxa named by Valerie Todd Davies